Brissidae is a family of echinoderms belonging to the order Spatangoida.

Genera

Genera:
 Anabrissus Mortensen, 1950
 Anametalia Mortensen, 1950
 Brissalius Coppard, 2008
 Brissopsis L. Agassiz, 1840
 Brissus Gray, 1825

References

 
Spatangoida
Echinoderm families